"Shrimp on the barbie" is a phrase that originated in a series of television advertisements by the Australian Tourism Commission starring Paul Hogan from 1984 through to 1990. The full quote spoken by Hogan is "I'll slip an extra shrimp on the barbie for you", and the actual slogan of the ad was "". It has since been used, along with some variations, to make reference to Australia in popular culture.

Details
The advertisement pre-dated Hogan's popularity in the 1986 film Crocodile Dundee. Thus they were not initially seen as celebrity advertisements in the US, as he was relatively unknown in the United States (though well known in the UK through his long-running television comedy show), although the film somewhat increased the commercial's popularity.

The advertisements were developed by the Australian agency Mojo in conjunction with American agency N.W. Ayer. The campaign was launched during the National Football Conference Championship Game on 8 January 1984. Before the campaign, Australia was approximately number 78 on the "most desired" vacation destination list for Americans, but became number 7 three months after the launch, and soon became number 1 or 2 on Americans' "dream vacation" list, remaining in that position for most of the next two decades.

"" is Australian slang for barbecue and the phrase "slip a shrimp on the barbie" often evokes images of a fun social gathering under the sun. Australians, however, invariably use the word  rather than shrimp. Because the commercial was commissioned for broadcast in the United States, the change was made to limit audience confusion. The commercial was so influential that three decades later, Australian USC Trojans football player Chris Tilbey reported that he was quoted the "shrimp on the barbie" line "Every day. Every day", and Jesse Mirco of Ohio State said he heard it daily.

The term was used in the 1988 film Dirty Rotten Scoundrels, when Lawrence Jamieson (played by Michael Caine) pretends to be Australian and says "We'll put some shrimps on the barbie for you". It was also used in the opening sequence of the 1994 cult comedy Dumb and Dumber, when protagonist Lloyd Christmas (portrayed by Jim Carrey) tries to hit on an Austrian woman, mistaking her for an Australian: "Let's put another shrimp on the barbie". She then turns him down, saying "Let's not". In the 2019 video game Mortal Kombat 11, the phrase is used by Cassie Cage (an American soldier) to mock Kano (an Australian weapon dealer), who responds by saying that "[she] sound[s] like a shit-ass American tourist".

Prawns are a popular traditional Christmas seafood in Australia. However, crustaceans such as shrimp and prawns are less common, on average, in the Australian cuisine than in the United States.

See also

 So where the bloody hell are you?
 Tourism in Australia

References

Australian advertising slogans
1984 neologisms
Australian cuisine
Australian English
Australian slang
English phrases
Seafood
Tourism in Australia
Australian television commercials